Richiza can refer to one of:
 Richeza of Poland, Queen of Sweden (1116-1156)
 Rikissa Birgersdotter, Queen of Norway (c. 1237 – after 1288)